Divaneh (also Romanized as Dīvaneh; also known as Deyoneh and Dīūneh) is a village in Jaber-e Ansar Rural District, in the Central District of Abdanan County, Ilam Province, Iran. At the 2006 census, its population was 168, in 36 families.

References 

Populated places in Abdanan County